Negrete is a surname. Notable people with the surname include:

Jorge Negrete (1911-1953), Mexican singer and actor.
Lorenzo Negrete, Mexican singer, musician and actor.
Manuel Negrete (disambiguation), several people.

Paulo Sergio Negrete, Brazilian author, neuroscience researcher, and creator of Neuropedia, a teaching method. 
Pedro Celestino Negrete (1777–1846), Spanish politician and military man.